Laura Shovan is an American author and poet.

Since 2002, Shovan has been a part of the Artist in Education program for the Maryland State Arts Council. Shovan was the 24th writer-in-residence for the Howard County Poetry and Literature Society in Maryland, and she visited and taught at local schools as part of the program. 

Her debut novel was the middle grade verse book, The Last Fifth Grade of Emerson Elementary. In 2016, the book won the Children's and Young Adult Bloggers' Literary Award (Cybils Award) for poetry. Shovan's book, Takedown, was published in 2018.

Along with Saadia Faruqi, Shovan co-wrote the book A Place at the Table, which was published in 2020. The book is about two 11-year-olds—Pakistani-American Sara and Jewish Elizabeth—who develop a friendship after becoming cooking partners in class.

Works
The Last Fifth Grade of Emerson Elementary (2016)
Takedown (2018)
A Place at the Table (2020), co-written by Saadia Faruqi

References

Year of birth missing (living people)
Living people
21st-century American poets
21st-century American women writers
American women poets
21st-century American novelists
American women novelists
Poets from Maryland
Novelists from Maryland